CVJ may refer to:

 Chavaj railway station (station code), Gujarat, India
 Cuernavaca Airport (IATA code), Temixco, Morelos, Mexico